This list of American candidates for sainthood includes not only saints of the Catholic Church but also those who are not yet recognized as saints but as beati, venerabili, servants of God or candidates for sainthood and who are significantly associated with what was either at the time or subsequently became, the United States.

Catholicism in the United States began with the first European explorations and colonization of the Americas. Indeed, Columbus's expedition of 1492 included Catholic priests among the crew. Catholic missionaries were some of the first Europeans to reach many parts of French North America and British North America in the east, and Spanish North America in the Southwestern United States.

Several American Catholics have been considered for sainthood over the past 50 years. Catholics continue to contribute to American religious life. Most of these Americans were born after 1850.

American saints

 Isaac Jogues (1607–1646), René Goupil (1608–1642), and Jean de Lalande (d. 1646), Professed Priests and Religious of the Jesuits; among the North American Martyrs (France – Canada – U.S.)
 Beatified: 21 June 1925 by Pope Pius XI
 Canonized: 29 June 1930 by Pope Pius XI
 Francesca Saverio Cabrini (Frances Xavier) (1850–1917), Founder of the Missionary Sisters of the Sacred Heart of Jesus (Lodi, Italy – Illinois, U.S.)
 Declared Venerable: 21 November 1937
 Beatified: 13 November 1938 by Pope Pius XI
 Canonized: 7 July 1946 by Pope Pius XII
 Elizabeth Ann Bayley Seton (1774–1821), Widow; Founder of the Daughters of Charity of Saint Vincent de Paul in the United States, the Sisters of Charity of Cincinnati, the Sisters of Charity of Seton Hill, the Sisters of Charity of Saint Vincent de Paul of Halifax, the Sisters of Charity of Saint Vincent de Paul of New York, the Sisters of Charity of Saint Elizabeth of New Jersey (New York, U.S. – Rome, Italy – Maryland, U.S.)
 Declared Venerable: 18 December 1959
 Beatified: 17 March 1963 by Pope John XXIII
 Canonized: 14 September 1975 by Pope Paul VI
 John Nepomuk Neumann (John Nepomucene) (1811–1860), professed Priest of the Redemptorists; Archbishop of Philadelphia; Founder of the Sisters of Saint Francis of Philadelphia (Prachatice, Czech Republic – Pennsylvania, U.S.)
 Declared Venerable: 11 December 1921
 Beatified: 13 October 1963 by Pope Paul VI
 Canonized: 19 June 1977 by Pope Paul VI
 Rose-Philippine Duchesne (1769–1852), Professed Religious of the Society of the Religious of the Sacred Heart of Jesus (Isère, France – Missouri, U.S.)
 Declared Venerable: 17 March 1935
 Beatified: 12 May 1940 by Pope Pius XII
 Canonized: 3 July 1988 by Pope John Paul II
 Katharine Mary Drexel (1858–1955), Founder of the Sisters of the Blessed Sacrament for Indians and Colored People (Pennsylvania, U.S.)
 Declared Venerable: 26 January 1987
 Beatified: 20 November 1988 by Pope John Paul II
 Canonized: 1 October 2000 by Pope John Paul II
 Anne-Thérèse Guérin (Mother Théodore) (1798–1856), Founder of the Sisters of Providence of Saint Mary-of-the-Woods (Côtes-d'Armor, France – Indiana, U.S.)
 Declared Venerable: 11 July 1992
 Beatified: 25 October 1998 by Pope John Paul II
 Canonized: 15 October 2006 by Pope Benedict XVI
 Jozef De Veuster (Father Damien) (1840–1889), Professed Priest of the Congregation of the Sacred Hearts of Jesus and Mary (Picpus Fathers) (Vlaams-Brabant, Belgium – Molokai, Hawaii, later part of U.S.)
 Declared Venerable: 7 July 1977
 Beatified: 4 June 1995 by Pope John Paul II
 Canonized: 11 October 2009 by Pope Benedict XVI
 Pedro Calungsod (ca. 1654–1672), Layperson of the Archdiocese of Cebu; Martyr (Cebu, Philippines – Tumon, Guam (U.S. Territory))
 Declared Venerable: 27 January 2000
 Beatified: 5 March 2000 by Pope John Paul II
 Canonized: 21 October 2012 by Pope Benedict XVI
 Barbara Cope (Marianne) (1838–1918), Professed Religious of the Franciscan Sisters of Syracuse (Bergstrasse, Germany – Hawaii, U.S.)
 Declared Venerable: 19 April 2004
 Beatified: 14 May 2005 by Cardinal José Saraiva Martins
 Canonized: 21 October 2012 by Pope Benedict XVI
 Kateri Tekakwitha (ca. 1656–1680), Layperson of the Archdiocese of Montreal (New York, U.S. – Québec, Canada)
 Declared Venerable: 3 January 1943
 Beatified: 22 June 1980 by Pope John Paul II
 Canonized: 21 October 2012 by Pope Benedict XVI
 Miguel José Serra Ferrer (Fra Junípero) (1713–1784), Professed Priest of the Franciscan Friars Minor (Mallorca, Spain – California, U.S.)
 Declared Venerable: 9 May 1985
 Beatified: 25 September 1988 by Pope John Paul II
 Canonized: 23 September 2015 by Pope Francis
 Anjëzë Gonxhe Bojaxhiu (Mother Teresa) (1910–1997), Founder of the Missionaries of Charity (Skopje, Macedonia – West Bengal, India; honorary U.S. citizen)
 Declared Venerable: 20 December 2002
 Beatified: 19 October 2003 by Pope John Paul II
 Canonized: 4 September 2016 by Pope Francis

American beati

 Maria Franziska Schervier (1819–1876), Founder of the Poor Sisters of Saint Francis and the Franciscan Sisters of the Poor (North Rhine-Westphalia, Germany – Ohio, USA – North Rhine-Westphalia, Germany)
Declared Venerable: 30 January 1969
Beatified: 28 April 1974 by Pope Paul VI
 Diego Luis de San Vitores (1627–1672), Professed Priest of the Jesuits; Martyr (Burgos, Spain – Tumon, Guam (U.S. Territory))
Declared Venerable: 9 November 1984
Beatified: 6 October 1985 by Pope John Paul II
 Francis Xavier Seelos (Francis Xavier) (1819–1867), Professed Priest of the Redemptorists (Bavaria, Germany – Louisiana, USA)
Declared Venerable: 27 January 2000
Beatified: 9 April 2000 by Pope John Paul II
 Carlos Manuel Cecilio Rodríguez Santiago (1918–1963), Layperson of the Diocese of Caguas (Caguas, Puerto Rico)
Declared Venerable: 7 July 1997
Beatified: 29 April 2001 by Pope John Paul II
 Josep Tristany Pujol (Lluc of Saint Joseph) (1872–1936) and Ricardo Farré Masip (Eduardo of the Child Jesus) (1897–1936), Professed Priests of the Discalced Carmelites (Lleida, Spain – Tucson, Arizona – Barcelona, Spain)
Declared Venerable: 22 June 2004
Beatified: 28 October 2007 by Cardinal José Saraiva Martins
 Teresa Demjanovich (Miriam Teresa) (1901–1927), Professed Religious of the Sisters of Charity of Saint Elizabeth (New Jersey, USA)
Declared Venerable: 10 May 2012
Beatified: 4 October 2014 by Cardinal Angelo Amato, S.D.B.
 Stanley Francis Rother (1935–1981), Priest of the Archdiocese of Oklahoma City; Martyr (Oklahoma, USA – Sololá, Guatemala)
Declared Venerable: 1 December 2016
Beatified: 23 September 2017 by Cardinal Angelo Amato, S.D.B.
 Bernard Casey (Francis Solanus) (1870–1957), Professed Priest of the Franciscan Capuchins (Wisconsin, USA – Michigan, USA)
Declared Venerable: 11 July 1995
Beatified: 18 November 2017 by Cardinal Angelo Amato, S.D.B.
 James Alfred Miller (Leo William) [Santiago] (1944–1982), Professed Religious of the Brothers of the Christian Schools (De La Salle Brothers); Martyr (Wisconsin, USA – Huehuetenango, Guatemala)
Declared Venerable: 7 November 2018
Beatified: 7 December 2019 by Cardinal José Luis Lacunza Maestrojuán
 Michael Joseph McGivney (1852–1890), Priest of the Archdiocese of Hartford; Founder of the Knights of Columbus (Connecticut, USA)
Declared Venerable: 15 March 2008
Beatified: 31 October 2020 by Cardinal Joseph William Tobin

American venerabili

 Cornelia Peacock Connelly (1809–1879), Founder of the Society of the Holy Child Jesus (Pennsylvania, USA – England, United Kingdom)
Declared Venerable: June 13, 1992
 Samuel Charles Mazzuchelli (1806–1864), Professed Priest of the Dominicans; Founder of the Dominican Sisters of the Most Holy Rosary of Sinsinawa (Milan, Italy – Wisconsin, USA)
Declared Venerable: July 6, 1993
 Józefina Dudzik (Mary Therese) (1860–1918), Founder of the Franciscan Sisters of Chicago (Sępólno, Poland – Illinois, USA)
Declared Venerable: March 26, 1994
 Pierre Toussaint (1766–1853), Married Layperson of the Archdiocese of New York (Artibonite, Haiti – New York, USA)
Declared Venerable: December 17, 1996
 Henriette DeLille (1813–1862), Founder of the Sisters of the Holy Family of New Orleans (Louisiana, USA)
Declared Venerable: March 27, 2010
 Kasimira Kaupas (Maria) (1880–1940), Founder of the Sisters of Saint Casimir (Panevėžys, Lithuania – Illinois, USA)
Declared Venerable: July 1, 2010
 Nelson Baker (1842–1936), Priest of the Diocese of Buffalo (New York, USA)
Declared Venerable: January 14, 2011
 Félix Varela Morales (1788–1853), Priest of the Archdiocese of San Cristóbal de La Habana (Havana, Cuba – Florida, USA)
Declared Venerable: March 14, 2012
 Frederic Irenaeus Baraga (1797–1868), Bishop of Marquette (Trebnje, Slovenia – Michigan, USA)
Declared Venerable: May 10, 2012
 Bridget Teresa McCrory (Mary Angeline Teresa) (1893–1984), Founder of the Carmelite Sisters for the Aged and Infirm (Northern Ireland, United Kingdom – New York, USA)
Declared Venerable: June 28, 2012
 Fulton John Sheen (1895–1979), Bishop of Rochester; Titular Archbishop of Newport (Illinois, USA – New York, USA)
Declared Venerable: June 28, 2012
 Celestina Bottego (1895–1980), Founder of the Xaverian Missionary Sisters, Society of Mary (Ohio, USA – Parma, Italy)
Declared Venerable: October 31, 2013
 Rafael Cordero Molina (1790–1868), Layperson of the Archdiocese of San Juan de Puerto Rico (San Juan, Puerto Rico)
Declared Venerable: December 9, 2013
 Aloysius Schwartz (1930–1992), Priest of the Archdiocese of Manila; Founder of the Sisters of Mary of Banneux and the Brothers of Christ (Washington D.C., USA – Manila, Philippines)
Declared Venerable: January 22, 2015
 William Gagnon (1905–1972), Professed Religious of the Hospitaller Brothers of Saint John of God (New Hampshire, USA – Saigon, Vietnam)
Declared Venerable: December 14, 2015
 Alphonse Gallegos (1931–1991), Professed Religious of the Augustinian Recollects; Titular Bishop of Sasabe; Auxiliary Bishop of Sacramento (New Mexico, USA – California, USA)
Declared Venerable: July 8, 2016
 Teresa Fardella di Blasi (1867–1957), Widow; Founder of the Poor Daughters of the Crowned Virgin (New York, USA – Trapani, Italy)
Declared Venerable: November 8, 2017
 Patrick Peyton (1909–1992), Professed Priest of the Congregation of Holy Cross (Mayo, Ireland- Manila, Philippines – California, USA)
Declared Venerable: December 18, 2017
 Norbert McAuliffe (1886–1959), Professed Religious of the Brothers of the Sacred Heart (New York, USA – Gulu, Uganda)
Declared Venerable: May 19, 2018
 Antonietta Giugliano (1909–1960), Cofounder of the Little Servants of Christ the King (New York, USA – Naples, Italy)
Declared Venerable: December 21, 2018
 María Consuelo Sanjurjo Santos (María Soledad) (1892–1973), Professed Religious of the Servants of Mary, Ministers of the Sick (Arecibo, Puerto Rico – San Juan, Puerto Rico)
Declared Venerable: January 15, 2019
 Augustin Arnaud Pagès (Nymphas Victorin) (1885–1966), Professed Religious of the Brothers of the Christian Schools (De La Salle Brothers) (Haute-Loire, France – San Juan, Puerto Rico)
Declared Venerable: April 6, 2019
 Augustus Tolton (1854–1897), Priest of the Archdiocese of Chicago (Missouri, USA – Illinois, USA)
Declared Venerable: June 11, 2019
 Mario Hiriart Pulido (1931–1964), Layperson of the Archdiocese of Santiago de Chile; Member of the Secular Institute of the Schöenstatt Brothers of Mary (Santiago, Chile – Wisconsin, USA)
Declared Venerable: February 21, 2020
 Eusebio Francesco Chini (1645–1711), Professed Priest of the Jesuits (Trent, Italy – Arizona, USA – Sonora, Mexico)
Declared Venerable: July 10, 2020

American servants of God
The following list is based according to the Congregation for the Causes of Saints.
 Luis de Cáncer (ca. 1500–1549), Antonio Cuipa (d. 1704) and 84 companion martyrs of the "La Florida" Missions (d. 1549–1706), Professed Priests and Religious of the Dominicans, Jesuits, and the Franciscan Friars Minor; Laypeople from the Dioceses of Pensacola-Tallahassee, Orlando, Venice, and Saint Augustine; Martyrs (Florida, USA)
 Martyrs of Virginia
 Luis de Quirós (d. 1571), Professed Priest of the Jesuits (Cadíz, Spain)
 Gabriel de Solís (d. 1571), Novice of the Jesuits (Spain)
 Juan Bautista Méndez (d. 1571), Novice of the Jesuits (Spain)
 Juan Bautista de Segura (1529–1571), Professed Priest of the Jesuits (Toledo, Spain)
 Gabriel Gómez (d. 1571), Professed Religious of the Jesuits (Granada, Spain)
 Sancho Zeballos (d. 1571), Professed Religious of the Jesuits (Seville, Spain)
 Pedro Mingot Linares (d. 1571), Professed Religious of the Jesuits (Valencia, Spain)
 Cristóbal Redondo (d. 1571), Novice of the Jesuits (Spain)
 Martyrs of Georgia:
 Pedro de Corpa (ca. 1555–1597), Professed Priest of the Franciscan Friars Minor (Burgos, Spain)
 Blas de Rodríguez (ca. 1500–1597), Professed Priest of the Franciscan Friars Minor (Cáceres, Spain)
 Miguel de Añon (ca. 1550 to 1560–1597), Professed Priest of the Franciscan Friars Minor (Zaragoza, Spain)
 Antonio de Badajoz (ca. 1550–1597), Professed Religious of the Franciscan Friars Minor (Badajoz, Spain)
 Francisco de Beráscola (ca. 1560 to 1570–1597), Professed Religious of the Franciscan Friars Minor (Vizcaya, Spain)
 Felice de Andreis (1778–1820), Priest of the Congregation of the Mission (Vincentians) (Cuneo, Italy – Missouri, USA)
 Magí Catalá Guasch (1761–1830), Professed Priest of the Franciscan Friars Minor (Tarragona, Spain – California, USA)
 Simon-Guillaume-Gabriel Bruté de Rémur (1779–1839), Bishop of Indianapolis (Ille-et-Vilaine, France – Indiana, USA)
 Demetrius Augustine Gallitzin (1770–1840), Priest of the Diocese of Altoona-Johnstown (The Hague, Netherlands – Pennsylvania, USA)
 Giuseppe Rosati (1789–1843), Priest of the Congregation of the Missions (Vincentians); Bishop of Fort Louis (Frosinone, Italy – Missouri, USA – Rome, Italy)
 Juliette Noel Toussaint (ca. 1786 – 1851), Married Layperson of the Archdiocese of New York (Haiti – New York, USA)
 Pierre-Jean-Mathias Loras (1792–1858), Bishop of Dubuque (Lyon, France – Iowa, USA)
 Martyrs of Shreveport (Louisiana, USA):
 Isidore Quémerais (1847–1873), Priest of the Diocese of Shreveport (Ille-et-Vilaine, France)
 Jean Pierre (1831–1873), Priest of the Diocese of Shreveport (Côtes-dʼArmor, France)
 Jean-Marie Bilier (1839–1873), Priest of the Diocese of Shreveport (Côtes-dʼArmor, France)
 Louis-Marie Gergaud (1832–1873), Priest of the Diocese of Shreveport (Loire-Atlantique, France)
 François Le Vézouët (1833–1873), Priest of the Diocese of Shreveport (Côtes-dʼArmor, France)
 Patrick Ryan (1845–1878), Priest of the Diocese of Knoxville (Tipperary, Ireland – Tennessee, USA)
 Mary Elizabeth Lange (ca. 1794–1882), Founder of the Oblate Sisters of Providence (Santiago de Cuba, Cuba – Maryland, USA)
 Isaac Thomas Hecker (1819–1888), Priest and Founder of the Missionary Society of Saint Paul the Apostle (Paulist Fathers) (New York, USA)
 Joan Adelaide O'Sullivan (María Adelaida of Saint Teresa) (1817–1893), Professed Religious of the Discalced Carmelite Nuns (New York, USA – León, Spain)
 Louis de Goesbriand (1816–1899), Bishop of Burlington (Finistère – Vermont, USA)
 Anna Bentivoglio (Maria Maddalena of the Sacred Heart of Jesus) (1824–1905), Professed Religious of the Poor Clare Nuns (Rome, Italy – Indiana, USA)
 Margaret Mary Healy Murphy (1833–1907), Widow; Founder of the Sisters of the Holy Spirit and Mary Immaculate (Cahersiveen, Ireland – Texas, USA)
 Joseph Heinrichs (Leo) (1867–1908), Professed Priest of the Franciscan Friars Minor; Martyr (Heinsberg, Germany – Colorado, USA)
 Adele-Louise-Marie de Mandat Grancey (1837–1915), Vowed Member of the Daughters of Charity of Saint Vincent de Paul (Côte-d'Or, France – Kansas, USA – Izmir, Turkey)
 Julia Greeley (ca. 1833–48 – 1918), Layperson of the Diocese of Denver (Missouri, USA – Colorado, USA)
 Thomas Frederick Price (1860–1919), Priest of the Diocese of Raleigh; Cofounder of the Maryknoll Missionary Society (North Carolina, USA – Hong Kong, China)
 Francis Joseph Parater (1897–1920), Seminarian of the Diocese of Richmond (Virginia, USA – Rome, Italy)
 John Eckert (Stephen of Dublin) (1869–1923), Professed Priest of the Franciscan Capuchins (Ontario, Canada – Wisconsin, USA)
 John O'Connell (Columba) (1848–1923), Professed Religious of the Congregation of Holy Cross (Pennsylvania – Indiana, United States)
 Jan Cieplak (1857–1926), Apostolic Administrator of Mohilev; Archbishop of Vilnius (Śląskie, Poland – New Jersey, USA)
 Theresia Ijsseldijk (Theresia of the Holy Trinity) (1897–1926), Professed Religious of the Carmelite Sisters of the Divine Heart of Jesus (Gelderland, Netherlands – Missouri, USA)
 Rose Hawthorne (Mary Alphonsa) (1851–1926), Founder of the Dominican Sisters of Saint Rose of Lima (Dominican Sisters of Hawthorne) (Massachusetts, USA – New York, USA)
 Maria Grazia Bellotti LaPercha (1882–1927), Married Layperson of the Archdiocese of Newark (Potenza, Italy – New Jersey, USA)
 Federico Salvador Ramón (1867–1931), Priest of the Diocese of Almería; Founder of the Servants of the Immaculate Child Mary (Almería, Spain – California, USA)
 Ira Barnes Dutton (Joseph) (1843–1931), Layperson of the Diocese of Honolulu; Member of the Secular Franciscans (Vermont, USA – Hawaii, USA)
 James Anthony Walsh (1891–1936), Priest and Cofounder of the Maryknoll Missionary Society; Titular Bishop of Seine-Assuan (Massachusetts, USA – New York, USA)
 Ángel Baraibar Moreno (1891–1936), Priest of the Archdiocese of Toledo; Martyr (San Juan, Puerto Rico – Toledo, Spain)
 Anna Marie Lindenberg (Theresa of Jesus) (1887–1939), Professed Religious of the Carmelite Nuns of the Ancient Observance (Münster, Germany – Pennsylvania, USA)
 Lewis Thomas Wattson (Paul James) (1863–1940), Founder and Professed Priest of the Franciscan Friars of the Atonement (Maryland, USA – New York, USA)
 Bernard John Quinn (1888–1940), Priest of the Diocese of Brooklyn (New Jersey, USA – New York, USA)
 Rosa Maria Segale (Blandina) (1850–1941), Professed Religious of the Sisters of Charity of Cincinnati (Genoa, Italy – Ohio, USA)
 Joseph Verbis Lafleur (1912–1944), Priest of the Military Ordinariate of the United States (Louisiana, USA – Zamboanga de Norte, Philippines)
 Edward Joseph Flanagan (1886–1948), Priest of the Archdiocese of Omaha (Roscommon, Ireland – Nebraska, USA – Berlin, Germany)
 Rhoda Greer Wise (1888–1948), Married Layperson of the Diocese of Youngstown (Ohio, USA)
 Nicholas Black Elk (1863–1950), Married Layperson of the Diocese of Grand Rapids (Wyoming, USA – South Dakota, USA)
 James Maginn (1911–1950), Priest of the Missionary Society of Saint Columban; Martyr (Montana, USA – Gangwon, South Korea)
 Patrick Brennan (1901–1950), Priest of the Missionary Society of Saint Columban; Vicar Apostolic of Kwangju; Martyr (Illinois, USA – Daejeon, South Korea)
 Emil Joseph Kapaun (1916–1951), Priest of the Diocese of Wichita (Kansas, USA – North Korea)
 Francis Xavier Ford (1892–1952), Priest of the Maryknoll Missionary Society; Bishop of Kaiying (New York, USA – Guangdong, China)
 Julia Teresa Tallon (Mary Teresa) (1867–1954), Founder of the Parish Visitors of Mary Immaculate (New York, USA)
 Mary Virginia Merrick (1866–1955), Layperson of the Archdiocese of Washington D.C.; Founder of the Christ Child Society (Washington D.C., USA)
 Cora Louise Yorgason Evans (1904–1957), Married Layperson of the Diocese of Monterrey (Utah, USA – California, USA)
 Teresa Kearney (Mary Kevin) (1875–1957), Founder of the Little Sisters of Saint Francis and the Franciscan Missionary Sisters for Africa (Wicklow, Ireland – Jinja, Uganda – Massachusetts, USA)
 Luigi Sturzo (1871-1959), Priest of the Diocese of Caltagirone (Caltagirone, Italy – London, England - New York, USA - Rome, Italy)
 Charlene Marie Richard (1947–1959), Child of the Diocese of Lafayette (Louisiana, USA)
 Vincent Robert Capodanno (1929–1967), Priest of the Maryknoll Missionary Society; Priest of the Military Ordinariate of the United States (New York, USA – Quàng Nam, Vietnam)
 Jean Martin Eyraud (1880–1968), Priest of the Archdiocese of New Orleans (Haute Alpes, France – Louisiana, USA)
 Giancarlo Rastelli (1933–1970), Married Layperson of the Diocese of Parma (Pescara, Italy – Minnesota, USA)
 William Evans (1919–1971), Professed Priest of the Congregation of Holy Cross (Massachusetts, USA – Dhaka, Bangladesh)
 Ernő Tindira (1892–1972), Priest of the Diocese of Mukacheve of the Latins; Martyr (Pennsylvania, USA – Mukacheve, Ukraine)
 Daniel Foley (Theodore of Mary Immaculate) (1913–1974), Professed Priest of the Passionists (Massachusetts, USA – Rome, Italy)
 Michael Jerome Cypher (Casimir) (1941–1975), Professed Priest of Franciscan Conventuals; Martyr (Wisconsin, USA – Olancho, Honduras)
 Paul Michael Murphy (1939–1976), Layperson of the Diocese of Phoenix; Consecrated Member of the Miles Jesu (Illinois, USA – Arizona, USA)
 Auguste [Nonco] Pelafigue (1888–1977), Layperson of the Diocese of Lafayette; Member of the Apostleship of Prayer League (Haute-Pyrénées, France – Louisiana, USA)
 George Willmann (1920–1977), Professed Priest of the Jesuits (New York, USA – Manila, Philippines)
 Dorothy Day (1897–1980), Layperson of the Archdiocese of New York; Founder of the Catholic Worker Movement (New York, USA)
 Juan Luis Ellacuria Echevarría (Aloysius) (1905–1981), Professed Priest of the Claretians (Vizcaya, Spain – California, USA)
 William Slattery (1895–1982), Priest of the Congregation of the Mission (Vincentians) (Maryland, USA – Pennsylvania, USA)
 Vincent Joseph McCauley (1906–1982), Professed Priest of the Congregation of Holy Cross; Archbishop of Fort Portal (Iowa USA – Minnesota, USA – Kampala, Uganda)
 José Luis Múzquiz de Miguel [Joseph Múzquiz] (1912–1983), Priest of the Personal Prelature of the Holy Cross and Opus Dei (Badajoz, Spain – Massachusetts, USA)
 Terence James Cooke (1921–1983), Archbishop of New York; Cardinal (New York, USA)
 Walter Ciszek (1904–1984), Professed Priest of the Jesuits (Pennsylvania, USA – New York, USA)
 John Maronic (1922–1985), Professed Priest of the Missionary Oblates of Mary Immaculate; Founder of the Victorious Missionaries (Minnesota, USA – Illinois, USA)
 Gabriel Wilhelmus Manek (1913–1989), Professed Priest of the Society of the Divine Word; Archbishop of Endeh; Founder of the Daughters of Our Lady Queen of the Holy Rosary (Nusa Tenggara Timur, Indonesia – Colorado, USA)
 Thea Bowman (1937–1990), Professed Religious of the Franciscan Sisters of Perpetual Adoration (Mississippi, USA)
 María Belen Guzmán Florit (Dominga) (1897–1993), Founder of the Dominican Sisters of Fatima (San Juan, Puerto Rico – Ponce, Puerto Rico)
 John Joseph McKniff (1907–1994), Professed Priest of the Augustinians (Pennsylvania, USA – Florida, USA – Piura, Peru)
 Rossella Petrellese (1972–1994), Layperson of the Diocese of Acerra (Naples, Italy – Minnesota, USA)
 Gabriel Gonsum Ganaka (1937–1999), Archbishop of Jos (Plateau, Nigeria – New York, USA)
 Ida Peterfy (1922–2000), Founder of the Society Devoted to the Sacred Heart (Košice, Slovakia – California, USA)
 Gertrude Agnes Barber (1911–2000), Layperson of the Diocese of Erie (Pennsylvania, USA)
 John Anthony Hardon (1914–2000), Professed Priest of the Jesuits (Pennsylvania, USA – Michigan, USA)
 Leonard LaRue (Marinus) (1914–2001), Professed Religious of the Benedictines (Ottilien Congregatian) (Pennsylvania – New Jersey, USA)
 Gwen Cecilia Billings Conicker (1939–2002), Married Layperson of the Diocese of Steubenville; Cofounder of the Apostolate for Family Consecration (Illinois, USA – Ohio, USA)
 Joseph Henry Cappel (1908–2004), Priest of the Maryknoll Missionary Society (Kentucky, USA – Talca, Chile)
 Maria Esperanza Medrano Parra de Bianchini (1928–2004), Married Layperson of the Dioceses of Los Teques and Metuche (Monagas, Venezuela – New Jersey, USA)
 Fernando Rielo Pardal (1923–2004), Layperson of the Archdiocese of Madrid; Founder of the Idente Missionaries of Christ the Redeemer (Madrid, Spain – New York, USA)
 Joseph Walijewski (1914–2006), Priest of the Diocese of La Crosse (Michigan, USA – Lima, Peru)
 William Edward [Bill] Atkinson (1946–2006), Professed Priest of the Augustinians (Pennsylvania, USA)
 Irving Charles Houle (Francis) (1925–2009), Married Layperson of the Diocese of Marquette (Michigan, USA)
 Michelle Christine Duppong (1984–2015), Layperson of the Diocese of Bismarck; Member of the Fellowship of Catholic University Students (Colorado – North Dakota, USA)

See also

 List of American proposed candidates for sainthood

Blessed

Congregation for the Causes of Saints
List of Brazilian saints
List of saints of the Canary Islands
List of Canadian Roman Catholic saints
List of Central American and Caribbean saints
List of Filipino saints, blesseds, and servants of God
List of Mexican saints
List of Saints from Africa
List of Saints from India
List of Saints from Oceania
List of Scandinavian saints
List of South American saints
List of European saints
Saint
Servant of God
Venerable

Footnotes

References
Amodei, Mike. "American Saints and Blesseds", Engaging Faith, January 5, 2009. Retrieved on 2009-10-09.
CatholicHistory.Net. "Spotlight: American Saints". Retrieved on 2009-10-09.
Congregation for the Causes of Saints. "Recent Saints canonized". Retrieved on 2009-10-13.
 Congregation for the Causes of Saints. "Recent Blesseds beatified". Retrieved on 2009-10-13.
 

 
 
Medjugorje Center of Pacifica. "All For Mary: American Saints". Retrieved on 2009-10-09.
Time. "American Saints", Time, April 7, 1930. Retrieved on 2009-10-09.
Tucson Citizen. "2 Tucson Priests to be beatified", June 12, 2007.

 

Saints
Saints
American
Z
Z

+
Saints
Saints